Kiss is an American rock band from New York. Formed in January 1973, the group originally included rhythm guitarist and vocalist Paul Stanley, bassist and vocalist Gene Simmons, lead guitarist Ace Frehley and drummer Peter Criss. Songwriting is typically led by Stanley and Simmons, who also perform the majority of lead vocals, although all members regularly contribute. The band's self-titled debut album featured only one songwriting credit for Frehley and Criss (on "Love Theme from Kiss", written by all four members), as well as a cover version of Bobby Rydell's "Kissin' Time". Frehley wrote or co-wrote three songs on Hotter than Hell, and two on 1975's Dressed to Kill. For Destroyer, the band worked closely with producer Bob Ezrin, who was credited for songwriting on seven of the album's nine tracks.

Rock and Roll Over, released in 1976, was again led by Stanley and Simmons, with Sean Delaney co-credited alongside the former on three tracks. 1977's Love Gun featured a writing credit each for Frehley and Criss, as well as a cover of "Then She Kissed Me", originally by The Crystals. After each member released an eponymous solo album in 1978, Kiss returned in 1979 with Dynasty, which featured session drummer Anton Fig in place of the injured Criss. Fig also performed on Unmasked the following year, by which time Criss had left Kiss. Unmasked included several songwriters from outside of the band, including producer Vini Poncia on all but three tracks. Following the addition of Eric Carr on drums, the band released Music from "The Elder" in 1981, which was the last to feature Frehley who departed the following year.

Frehley was replaced by Vinnie Vincent, who first wrote and performed on Creatures of the Night in 1982. The album also featured two songs co-written by Bryan Adams and Jim Vallance. Vincent remained for the 1983 follow-up Lick It Up, although left after the album's touring cycle. He was replaced for Animalize by Mark St. John, which included songs co-written by Desmond Child, Mitch Weissman and Jean Beauvoir. Bruce Kulick debuted on Asylum as the band's fourth lead guitarist, which again included credits for Child and Beauvoir. Crazy Nights and Hot in the Shade featured returning contributors Poncia, Child and Weissman, as well as new additions such as Tommy Thayer, Michael Bolton and Bob Halligan Jr. Carr died of cancer on November 24, 1991, with Eric Singer taking over as the band's drummer.

The band's 1992 release Revenge was largely co-written with Ezrin, who had returned as producer. In 1996, Frehley and Criss returned for an original lineup reunion tour. The group released Psycho Circus in 1998, which was primarily written by Stanley and Simmons with contributions from Curtis Cuomo, Holly Knight, Karl Cochran, Ezrin and Kulick. By 2004, the lineup of Kiss included lead guitarist Thayer and drummer Singer. The group's next studio album followed in 2009 – Sonic Boom was written entirely by the band's members, with all but Singer credited. 2012's Monster credited the drummer on just one track, "Back to the Stone Age", which was written by the whole band. In early 2015, Kiss released a single in collaboration with Japanese idol group Momoiro Clover Z entitled "Yume no Ukiyo ni Saite Mi na".

Songs

See also
Kiss discography

References

External links
Kiss official website

Kiss